Friends & Brgrs is a Finnish fast food restaurant chain, originally from Jakobstad, Finland.

Products 
Their buns are baked and meats are ground in the restaurants. The mayonnaises and french fries are made by the staff as well. The french fries are made with a so-called triple-cook method meaning that they are fried three times in different temperatures. The Finnish restaurant's domesticity rate is about 98%. The meals are almost fully additive-free.

History

The first Friends & Brgrs restaurant was opened in Jakobstad in 2014. After that they have spread out to other cities in Finland, as well as Germany in 2017.

References

Fast-food chains of Finland
Restaurants established in 2014
2014 establishments in Finland